The Schwändibleme (also spelled Schwendiblueme; 1,396 m) is a mountain of the Emmental Alps, overlooking Lake Thun in the canton of Bern. The mountain is located between Teuffenthal, Schwendi and Schwanden.

The mountain is almost completely wooded. A slightly lower summit (1,392 m) named simply Blume is located east of the main summit. It includes an observation tower.

References

External links
Schwändiblueme on Hikr

Mountains of the Alps
Mountains of Switzerland
Mountains of the canton of Bern
Emmental Alps
One-thousanders of Switzerland